Landry Chirst Nnoko (born April 9, 1994) is a Cameroonian professional basketball player for Suwon KT Sonicboom of the Korean Basketball League.

College career 
After coming to the U.S. to play high school basketball at Montverde Academy, Nnoko committed to Clemson for college. He played four seasons for the Tigers and was a three-year starter known primarily for his shot-blocking and defence. As a senior, Nnoko earned Atlantic Coast Conference (ACC) All-Defensive team honours and led the league in blocked shots.

Professional career
Following the close of his college career, Nnoko signed with Victoria Libertas Pesaro of Italy's Serie A. He averaged 6.4 points and 7.1 rebounds per game for the 2016–17 season.

At the start of the 2017–18 season, Nnoko was signed by the Detroit Pistons of the NBA as a part of their training camp roster. After being cut in training camp, he signed with the Pistons′ NBA G League franchise, the Grand Rapids Drive. At the close of the G League season, Nnoko was named the league′s Defensive Player of the Year.

On July 29, 2018, Nnoko signed with Sakarya BB of the Turkish Basketbol Süper Ligi.

In December 2018, Nnoko signed with Alba Berlin of the German Basketball Bundesliga.

On June 29, 2020, Nnoko signed with Serbian club Crvena zvezda of the ABA League. On September 6, the club discharged him due to medical reasons. However, he returned to the Zvezda on 25 December. He solved his health problem at the Mayo Clinic in Rochester, Minnesota and received a permit to return to basketball without any limitations.

On August 15, 2021, he has signed with Saski Baskonia of the EuroLeague and the Liga ACB. On January 4, 2021, Nnoko and Baskonia parted ways. The following day, he signed with San Pablo Burgos.

On August 2, 2022, he has signed with Suwon KT Sonicboom of the Korean Basketball League.

Personal life
Nnoko is the cousin of NBA player Luc Mbah a Moute.

References

External links
Italian League profile
Clemson Tigers bio

1994 births
Living people
ABA League players
Alba Berlin players
Basketball League of Serbia players
Basketball players from Yaoundé
Cameroonian expatriate basketball people in Germany
Cameroonian expatriate basketball people in Serbia
Cameroonian expatriate basketball people in Spain
Cameroonian expatriate basketball people in the United States
Cameroonian expatriate sportspeople in Italy
Cameroonian expatriate sportspeople in Turkey
Cameroonian men's basketball players
CB Miraflores players
Centers (basketball)
Clemson Tigers men's basketball players
Grand Rapids Drive players
Lega Basket Serie A players
Montverde Academy alumni
KK Crvena zvezda players
Sakarya BB players
Saski Baskonia players
Victoria Libertas Pallacanestro players